9th parallel may refer to:

9th parallel north, a circle of latitude in the Northern Hemisphere
9th parallel south, a circle of latitude in the Southern Hemisphere